The Port of Limassol is the largest port in Cyprus, located in the city of Limassol.

Location 
The port is located in the Eastern Mediterranean and is considered one of the busiest ports in the Mediterranean transit trade.

Importance

Limassol's New Port is now the principal seaport of the island. This was largely a direct result of the Turkish invasion of Cyprus in 1974 leaving the Port of Famagusta within occupied territory and inaccessible to Greek Cypriots. Cyprus is an established player in the shipping industry. The city of Limassol is a centre for numerous global shipping companies. Most of the island’s cargo (importation and exportation) is also handled in this port. In the year 2000, 3,589,000 tonnes of cargo were handled whilst there were roughly 1 million passenger arrival and departures (>90% of total traffic). Over 50 international cruise liners include Cyprus in their Mediterranean Sea routes resulting in much of the passenger traffic.

Operations
In 2016 the port has been privatized to a consortium led by Eurogate International for the container terminal, while DP World will be the operator for multipurpose passenger terminal.

Humanitarian Hub
The port has served numerous times as an evacuation point for refugees fleeing from conflict in the Middle East. Most recently hundreds of thousands of EU and other citizens were evacuated from Lebanon.

Limassol Old Port
Limassol Old Port used to be the main port of Limassol, between its construction (in its current form) in 1956 up until the delivery of the Limassol New Port in 1973. Its original foundations were laid during the British Cyprus in the late 19th century. Up to and including 1974, the British RAF 1153 Marine Craft Unit (MCU) was stationed in the western part of the harbor. It now serves as a leisure, fishing boat and coast guard shelter. Following an architectural competition, plans have been drawn up to revamp the area and transform it into a more functional leisure center. For that reason the Old Port had been officially closed and the project commenced after some delays under the name Limassol Marina in 2010.

See also
 Cyprus Merchant Marine
 Cyprus Ports Authority

References

Limassol
Limassol